Callimation is a genus of longhorn beetles of the subfamily Lamiinae, containing the following species:

 Callimation apicale Aurivillius, 1908
 Callimation corallinum Fiedler, 1939
 Callimation pontificum Thomson, 1857
 Callimation venustum Guérin-Méneville, 1844

References

Tragocephalini
Cerambycidae genera